Brownwood Park is a 12.33-acre community park located within the East Atlanta neighborhood of Atlanta, Georgia.

The Brownwood Park Recreation Center serves as a headquarters for the East Atlanta Kids Club, an after-school mentoring and tutoring program.

References

Parks in Atlanta